Saloon Bar is a 1939 British crime drama play written by Frank Harvey. It ran for a hundred and eighty performances at Wyndham's Theatre in London. The original cast included Gordon Harker, Mervyn Johns and Anna Konstam. It marked Margaret Johnston's West End debut.

Film adaptation

The following year the play was adapted into a film Saloon Bar directed by Walter Forde with Harker and several of the other stage performers reprising their roles.

References

Bibliography
 Wearing, J.P. The London Stage 1930-1939: A Calendar of Productions, Performers, and Personnel.  Rowman & Littlefield, 2014.

Plays by Frank Harvey
1939 plays
British plays adapted into films
Plays set in London
West End plays